Chrétien-Siméon Le Prévost d’Iray (13 June 1768 – 15 September 1849) was a French writer of comedies and vaudevilles.

A viscount, the son of Jean-Jacques Le Prévost, lord of Iray and Chauvigny, bodyguard of the king's house, and cavalry captain, Chrétien-Siméon Le Prévost d'Iray lost most of his estate during the French Revolution. After he collaborated to the Journal des dames et des modes and embarked without much success in the theater, he became professor of history and censor at the Lycée Louis-le-Grand and general inspector of education. He was a member of the Académie des Sciences, Arts et Belles-Lettres de Caen and, in 1818, a member of the Académie des inscriptions et belles-lettres.

Works 
Theatre
1793: La Clubomanie, comedy in 3 acts and in verse, Théâtre Molière, 11 July.
1795: Maître Adam, menuisier de Nevers, comedy in 1 act, in prose, mingled with vaudevilles, Théâtre du Vaudeville, 17 June.
1797: Les Troubadours, one-act comedy, in prose, mingled with vaudevilles, Théâtre du Vaudeville, 18 March.
1797: Alphonse et Léonore ou L'heureux procès, one-act comedy in prose, mingled with ariettes, Théâtre de la rue Feydeau, 29 November Read on line
1798: Manlius Torquatus, tragedy in 5 acts and in verse, Théâtre de l'Odéon, 27 January. 
1799: Le Quart-d'heure de Rabelais, one-act comedy in prose, mingled with vaudevilles, Théâtre du Vaudeville, 14 January.
1799: Aurore de Gusman, one-act opéra comique created at the Théâtre Feydeau 24 October, music by Tarchi.
1802: Carlin débutant à Bergame, one-act comedy in prose, mingled with vaudevilles, Théâtre du Vaudeville, 14 July.
1804: Jean Lafontaine, one-act comedy, mingled with vaudevilles, Théâtre du Vaudeville, 15 December.
Poetry
1824: La Vendée, Poème en six chants dédié à l’Armée Française, libératrice de l’Espagne 
1826: Poésies fugitives
Other
1801: Tableau comparatif de l'histoire ancienne, ouvrage élémentaire à l'usage des écoles publiques 
1804: Tableau comparatif de l'histoire moderne 
1827: Souvenirs poétiques

External links 
  Chrétien-Siméon Le Prévost d'Iray on data.bnf.fr
 His plays and their presentations on CÉSAR

18th-century French dramatists and playwrights
19th-century French dramatists and playwrights
18th-century French poets
18th-century French male writers
19th-century French poets
Members of the Académie des Inscriptions et Belles-Lettres
Writers from Normandy
1768 births
1849 deaths